Montgomery Primitive Baptist Church is a historic Primitive Baptist church building located near Merrimac, Montgomery County, Virginia.  It was built in 1922, and is a simple four-bay nave-plan frame church sheathed in weatherboard.  It has a gable roof with stamped metal shingles.  Also on the property is a contributing plain wooden preaching stand, also built about 1922.

It was listed on the National Register of Historic Places in 1989.

References

Baptist churches in Virginia
Churches on the National Register of Historic Places in Virginia
Churches completed in 1922
Churches in Montgomery County, Virginia
National Register of Historic Places in Montgomery County, Virginia